American country singer Carrie Underwood has received many awards and nominations for her work across music, film, television and fashion. She has released nine studio albums and one greatest hits collection — Some Hearts, Carnival Ride, Play On, Blown Away, Greatest Hits: Decade Number 1, Storyteller, Cry Pretty, My Gift, My Savior, and Denim & Rhinestones.

Among over 180 worldwide awards, Underwood has won eight Grammy Awards and became, in 2007, only the second country artist in history to win the Grammy Award for Best New Artist.

Academy of Country Music Awards
The Academy of Country Music Awards is an annual country music awards show, the first ever created, established in 1964. In 2010, Underwood made history by becoming the first woman to ever receive the Entertainer of the Year Award twice, in addition to being the first to ever win the award consecutively. She broke her own record in September 2020, becoming the first and only woman in history to win the award three times. In 2014, she won the Gene Weed Special Achievement Award, for her widespread exposure through National Football League NBC Sunday Night Football, the NBC broadcast of The Sound of Music Live!, her Blown Away Tour and her charity work with the American Red Cross and her C.A.T.S. Foundation. She is also the first person to win the ACM Lifting Lives Gary Haber Award, which recognizes a country music artist or industry professional "who is committed to serving others, has a generosity of spirit and shows a dedication to helping those in need". Underwood is one of the most awarded women in the history of the ACM Awards. She has won a total of 16 ACM Awards.

American Country Awards
The American Country Awards was a country music awards show, entirely voted on by fans. Created by the Fox Network, the awards honored country music artists in music, video, and touring categories. It lasted four years. Underwood won twelve awards, more than any other artist.

American Country Countdown Awards
The American Country Countdown Awards is an annual country music awards show that honors artists based on their album sales, touring data and the amount of their radio airplay. It is named after the long-running radio show American Country Countdown.

American Music Awards
The American Music Awards is an annual major American music award show by the American Broadcasting Company, presented since 1973. Underwood has won seventeen awards out of twenty-three nominations. She is the only artist in AMA history to have won Favorite Country Album for every studio album released.

Billboard Music Awards
The Billboard Music Award is an honor given by Billboard, the preeminent publication covering the music business. Finalists are based on United States year-end chart performance according to Nielsen data for sales, number of downloads and total airplay. Underwood has won 12 Billboard Music Awards out of 24 nominations.

BMI Awards
The Broadcast Music, Incorporated (BMI) Awards is an annual award show hosted for the purpose of giving awards to songwriters. Songwriters are selected each year from the entire BMI catalog, based on the number of performances during the award period. Underwood has been honored with 14 BMI Country awards for songwriting. She has also won 14 BMI Million-Air Awards, which are acknowledgements of songs that have achieved one million or more spins on radio. Additionally, at the 69th annual BMI/NAB Dinner in 2017, Underwood received the BMI Board of Directors Award, for the impact her music has had on the broadcast industry, as well as her many contributions as a songwriter.

BMI Country Awards

BMI Million-Air Awards

BMI/NAB Dinner

British Country Music Awards
The British Country Music Awards (BCM Awards) are held annually by the British Country Music Association to honor national and international success for country music artists familiar to the United Kingdom. Underwood has won once.

Celebrity Fight Night
Celebrity Fight Night Foundation, Inc. is a non-profit organization that was established to promote ongoing efforts to eliminate sickness and poverty. It annually holds the Muhammad Ali's "Celebrity Fight Night" charity event. The Foundation also established the "Muhammad Ali Celebrity Fight Night Award", which acknowledges leaders in the sports, entertainment and business communities who best represent the qualities associated with the Alis' fight to find a cure for Parkinson's disease. Underwood received the award in 2016.

Clio Awards
The Clio Awards is an annual award program that recognizes innovation and creative excellence in advertising, design and communication, as judged by an international panel of advertising professionals. It has been held since 1960.

Country Music Association Awards
The Country Music Association Awards is an annual country music awards show, established in 1967. Underwood has won nine awards, including both the Chairman's Award and International Artist Achievement award, which recognizes outstanding achievement by a U.S.-based artist who contributes to the awareness and development of country music worldwide. Underwoood has won nine awards out of forty-one nominations.

Country Music Awards of Australia
The Country Music Awards of Australia are held by the Country Music Association of Australia to celebrate recording excellence in the Australian country music industry. They were originally established in 1973. Underwood has won once.

CMC Music Awards

CMT Awards

CMT Artists of the Year Awards
The CMT Artists of the Year Awards are given by Country Music Television to honor the top country acts of each year. The show was established in 2010. Underwood has been awarded five times.

CMT Music Awards
The CMT Music Awards is an annual ceremony dedicated exclusively to honor country music videos. It was established in 1967, and had several names throughout the years. In 2002, it was moved to Country Music Television and, in 2005, was renamed CMT Music Awards.
With 25 wins, Underwood is the most awarded artist overall in the show's history. She also has the most Video of the Year wins and Female Video of the Year wins.

CMT Online Awards
CMT Online Awards were an annual online award show, established in 2006 by Country Music Television. This was a "fan-voted" award show, based on the fans going to CMT.com streaming the videos and viewing the artists' pages. The winner in each category received the highest numbers of streams and views on CMT.com.

CMT Teddy Awards
The CMT Teddy Awards were a special music video award show dedicated to celebrate Valentine's Day. There were eight categories. Underwood won two awards.

Country Radio Seminar
The Country Radio Seminar (CRS) is one of the largest media gatherings of any kind or of any format in the US founded in 1970 and is held annually by the Country Radio Broadcasters. The seminar also honors individuals related to country music with different awards. In 2014, the CRS' board of directors awarded Underwood the Artist Humanitarian Award, which was created in 1990 to honor those country music artists who have exhibited exceptional humanitarian efforts during their career.

European Country Music Association Awards
The European Country Music Association (ECMA) was established in 1994 in the United Kingdom and Spain, Europe, by people related to the European Country music scene, such as publishers, DJs and musics. It originally consisted of less than 100 members and the very first president was UK's Harry E. Fenton. Votes for nominations and winners come only from members of the organization. Underwood won once.

French Country Music Association Awards
The French Country Music Association Awards is an annual country music award show presented by the French Association of Country Music since 2004.

Gold Derby Music Awards
The Gold Derby Music Awards were established in 2021 to recognise the best in the recording industry of the year.

Golden Globe Awards
The Golden Globe Awards were established in 1944 by the Hollywood Foreign Press Association to celebrate the best in film and television.

GMA Dove Awards
A Dove Award is an accolade by the Gospel Music Association (GMA) of the United States to recognize outstanding achievement in the Christian music industry. The awards are presented, since 1969, at an annual ceremony called the GMA Dove Awards. Underwood has one two awards out of three nominations.

Grammy Awards
The Grammy Awards are presented annually by the National Academy of Recording Arts and Sciences for outstanding achievements in the music industry. Presented since 1958, Underwood has won eight awards, from 16 nominations. In 2007, she became only the second country artist in history to win the Best New Artist award, following LeAnn Rimes (1997).

Guinness World Records
The Guinness World Records is a reference book published annually, listing world records and national records, both of human achievements and the extremes of the natural world. Underwood currently holds six records.

Honors Gala
The Honors Gala is an event organized since 1975 by the T.J. Martell Foundation, the music industry's largest foundation that funds innovative medical research focused on finding cures for leukemia, cancer and AIDS. It honors individuals of several areas with different awards. At the 38th event, in 2013, Underwood received the Artist Achievement Award.

iHeartRadio Music Awards
The iHeartRadio Music Awards is an international music awards show founded by IHeartRadio in 2014. She has won one award out of nine nominations.

Inspirational Country Music Awards
The Inspirational Country Music Awards are a member-voted award show dedicated to honoring and showcasing the biggest names and emerging talent among artists who perform Christian and inspirational country music.

Music Row Awards
The MusicRow Awards is an annual awards show held by Nashville's music industry publication, MusicRow. The winners are selected by over 300 managers, musicians, songwriters, publishers and label executives. Underwood was awarded once.

MTV Movie & TV Awards 
The MTV Movie & TV Awards is a film and television awards shows presented annually on MTV. Originally the MTV Movie Awards it was rebranded as the MTV Movie & TV Awards in 2017, to also honor work in television. Underwood has one nomination.

MTV Video Music Awards
The MTV Video Music Awards are an annual fan-voted award show started in 1984.

Napster Awards
The Napster Awards honor artists and songs played most by subscribers.

Nashville Songwriters Association International Awards
The Nashville Songwriters Association International (NSAI) hosts industry professionals each year for the "World's Largest #1 Party", in association with the Recording Academy, to celebrate veteran hitmakers and talented new artists.

Nashville Symphony's Harmony
The Nashville Symphony's Harmony award is presented to individuals who have demonstrated continued interest and support of music in Nashville, exemplify the connections between the diverse music of the city and have contributed to the development and appreciation of music culture. It is presented during the annual Symphony Ball on Saturday at the Schermerhorn Symphony Center in downtown Nashville.

People's Choice Awards
The People's Choice Awards is an American awards show recognizing the people and the work of popular culture. The show has been held annually since 1975 and is a venue for the general public to honor their favorite actors and actresses, musical performers, television shows and motion pictures. Underwood has won ten awards, out of twenty-one nominations.

Pollstar Awards
The Pollstar Awards is ceremony to honor artists and professionals in the concert industry. It was created by Pollstar, the leading trade publication for the concert tour industry.

Radio Disney Music Awards
The Radio Disney Music Awards honor most popular and played artists for the previous years. The Hero Award is an honor for contribution for the charitable work.

Teen Choice Awards
The Teen Choice Awards is an annual show that honors the years biggest achievements in music, movies, sports, television, fashion and more. Underwood has won seven awards out of nineteen nominations.

Other honors

Grand Ole Opry
The Grand Ole Opry has been called the "Home of American Music" and "Country's most famous stage". Membership in the Opry remains one of Country Music's crowning achievements. Being made a member of the Grand Ole Opry, Country Music's big house, the oldest, most enduring "Hall of Fame," is to be identified as a member of the elite of Country Music.

Guinness World Records
The Guinness World Records honors the world's most impressive acts. Underwood has set five records.

Hollywood Walk of Fame
The Hollywood Walk of Fame is a sidewalk along Hollywood Boulevard and Vine Street in Hollywood, California, United States, that serves as an entertainment hall of fame. It is embedded with more than 2,000 five-pointed stars featuring the names of celebrities honored by the Hollywood Chamber of Commerce for their contributions to the entertainment industry. Underwood is part of the Class of 2018 of inductees.

Oklahoma Hall of Fame
The Oklahoma Memorial Association was founded in 1927 with the purpose of establishing the Oklahoma Hall of Fame. Being inducted into the Oklahoma Hall of Fame is considered to be the highest honor one can receive from the state. Underwood was inducted in 2017.

Oklahoma Music Hall of Fame
The Oklahoma Music Hall of Fame honors Oklahoma musicians for their lifetime achievements in music. The induction ceremony and concert is held each year in Muskogee. Underwood was inducted in 2009. She had previously been named the Hall's Rising Star in 2005.

References

Awards
Lists of awards received by American actor
Lists of awards received by American musician